Pedreira may refer to:

Brazil
 Pedreira, São Paulo, a municipality in São Paulo state
 Pedreira (district of São Paulo), a district of the city of São Paulo
 Pedreira River, a tributary of the Amazon River in Amapá
 Pedreira Esporte Clube, an association football club in Mosqueiro, Belém, Pará

Portugal
Pedreira, Rande e Sernande, a parish in the municipality of Felgueiras
Pedreira (Tomar), a parish in Tomar Municipality
Lagoa da Pedreira, a lake in the city of Póvoa de Varzim

See also
 Pedreiras (disambiguation)